Tjaart van der Walt (born 25 September 1974) is a South African professional golfer.

Career
Like many top golfers, van der Walt received a golf scholarship to study in the United States, attending Central Alabama Community College. He turned professional in 1996 and immediately joined his home tour in South Africa, the Sunshine Tour. He finished 45th in the Order of Merit in his first season as a professional, and improved to 7th the following year. In 1999, van der Walt attempted to qualify for the PGA Tour, and was successful enough to earn a place on the Nationwide Tour for 2000, prompting him to return to the U.S. He played successfully on that tour until 2003, recording runner-up finishes in his first two years, and choosing not to take up a place on the European Tour he had won for 2001 at the qualifying school, in preference for another Nationwide season.

In 2003, van der Walt successfully came through the PGA Tour qualifying school and secured himself a PGA Tour place for 2004. He spent the following three seasons at the level, with his best result coming in 2005 when he lost a playoff to Brad Faxon for the Buick Championship. In 2007, van der Walt returned to the Nationwide Tour, recording another runner-up finish. He was a Nationwide regular until losing his place on that tour at the end of 2010.

For 2011, van der Walt qualified for the first time for the Asian Tour. In his first season on that tour he compiled five top-10 finishes in ten events, including a runner-up at the ISPS Handa Singapore Classic, and finished 17th on the Order of Merit. At the end of the season he was named Asian Tour Rookie of the Year.

After his 2011 season, van der Walt entered qualifying school for the European Tour once more. Eleven years after previously earning his card at the school, he was once again successful in ensuring a place on the tour for 2012.

In the season opening event of the 2012 European Tour, van der Walt finished runner-up in the Africa Open to compatriot Louis Oosthuizen by two strokes.

Van der Walt has maintained a commitment to his home Sunshine Tour. Since his debut season in 1996–97 he has never played fewer than five tournaments a year on the tour, and has never finished lower than 70th on the Order of Merit.

Van der Walt has recorded an array of runners-up finishes across the globe, including the Sunshine Tour, Nationwide Tour, PGA Tour, European Tour and Asian Tour, but was never able to win a professional event until 2013. Van der Walt won the 2013 Lion of Africa Cape Town Open on the Sunshine Tour, seventeen years after turning pro.

In 2017, Van der Walt co-founded AnchorUp Sports – an exclusive talent management agency working with a select group of the world's top golfers. He currently holds the position of managing director at the company.

Professional wins (1)

Sunshine Tour wins (1)

Playoff record
PGA Tour playoff record (0–1)

European Tour playoff record (0–1)

Asian Tour playoff record (0–1)

Nationwide Tour playoff record (0–1)

Results in major championships

Note: van der Walt never played in the Masters Tournament or the PGA Championship.

CUT = missed the half-way cut
"T" = tied

Results in World Golf Championships

"T" = Tied

See also
2003 PGA Tour Qualifying School graduates
2011 European Tour Qualifying School graduates

References

External links

South African male golfers
Central Alabama Trojans men's golfers
Sunshine Tour golfers
European Tour golfers
PGA Tour golfers
Asian Tour golfers
Sportspeople from Pretoria
Afrikaner people
South African people of Dutch descent
South African expatriate sportspeople in the United States
Sportspeople from Durban
Golfers from Houston
1974 births
Living people